The title of Earl of Torrington was created twice in the Peerage of England.  The first creation was in 1660 as a subsidiary title of the Duke of Albemarle.  Following the extinction of this title in 1688, the title was created anew in 1689, but became extinct upon the death of the first earl in 1716.

Earls of Torrington, first creation (1660–1688)
See Duke of Albemarle

Earls of Torrington, second creation (1689)
Arthur Herbert, 1st Earl of Torrington (1648–1716)

See also
Viscount Torrington

Extinct earldoms in the Peerage of England
Noble titles created in 1660
Noble titles created in 1689
1660 establishments in England